Win Tun was the Minister of Environmental Conservation and Forestry of Myanmar from 2011 to 2016. He was appointed in February 2011 by President Thein Sein. He was previously Managing-Director of the Ministry of Forestry during the State Peace and Development Council era.

References

Government ministers of Myanmar
Living people
Year of birth missing (living people)